= Thai Students' Association in Japan under the Royal Patronage =

Thai Students’ Association in Japan under the Royal Patronage
- Logo of TSAJ
- Formation: 1939
- Headquarters: Japan 3-14-6, Kami-Osaki, Shinagawa-ku, Tokyo
- President: Dom Roongruang
- Affiliations: Thailand Royal Thai Embassy, Tokyo; Thailand Royal Thai Consulate-General, Osaka; Thailand Royal Thai Consulate-General, Fukuoka
- Staff: 70
- Website: tsaj.jp

Thai Students’ Association in Japan under the Royal Patronage (TSAJ) is the association of Thai students who are studying in Japan. It was established on April 4, 1939.

== History ==
TSAJ was established to encourage unity, create gainful activities for Thai students in Japan, and promote relationships among students, government officers, and Thai people living in Japan.

The establishment of TSAJ was initiated by the first group of Thai students who came to Japan in 1897 to study under the King of Thailand's scholarship. The association continued until April 4, 1939, when it was registered as the "Thai Students' Association in Japan". It was later taken under royal patronage in the same month by His Majesty King Bhumibol Adulyadej. It was then renamed "Thai Students’ Association in Japan under the Royal Patronage (TSAJ)".

TSAJ has managed a number of projects which are beneficial to academic, social, or cultural aspects. Examples of academic projects are conferences, educational counseling, and the collection of research abstracts. The projects that serve the social aspect are sports activities for Thai students, ski trips, and educational funds for Thai children in rural areas. Lastly, some of the projects which serve cultural aspects are the Thai exhibition, Songkran Festival, and Loy Krathong Festival.
